, also known by the name , is a Japanese film and television director and producer. He is one of several people who have been given credit for creating Ultraman.

Career 
After working as an assistant director at TBS, he joined Tsuburaya Productions in 1964. His first directed work was the 21 episode of Ultra Q, "Space Directive M774". He has directed and produced many works of Tsuburaya Productions including the original Ultraman series. In Ultraseven, he was selected for the final production. In addition, he also showed his musical and acoustic skills by effectively using the insert song "ULTRASEVEN" and the candidate song for the theme song (commonly known as "Ultra Seven Song Part II") that was rejected, and by performing the announcement of "Fourth Gate, Open!" that resonates in the base in the launching scene of Ultra Hawk 1.

Filmography

Director 

 Ultra Q (1966)
 Kaiju Booska (1966)
 Ultraman (1966)
 Ultraseven (1967)
 Operation: Mystery! (1968)
 Mighty Jack (1968)

Assistant director 

 Ultra Q (1966)

Producer 

 Daigoro vs. Goliath (1972)

Production manager 

 Ultra Fight (1970)

Planner 

 Ultraman Cosmos: The First Contact (2001)

Actor 

 Ultra Q (1966) as Policeman [episode 12] (uncredited)
 Ultraman Cosmos vs. Ultraman Justice: The Final Battle (2003) as SRC China Representative
 Ultraman Max (2006) as Director of UNBALANCE [episode 29]
 Superior Ultraman 8 Brothers (2008) as Hawaiian Restaurant Customer (uncredited)

Interviewee 

 Japanorama (2002)

References

External links 

 

1937 births
Living people
Japanese film directors
Japanese television directors
Japanese film producers